Kaveh Ahangar Rural District is a rural district (dehestan) in the Central District of Chadegan County, Isfahan Province, Iran. At the 2006 census, its population was 5,884, in 1,429 families.  The rural district has 6 villages.

References 

Rural Districts of Isfahan Province
Chadegan County